Daniel Claffey (28 November 1869 – 2 February 1924) was a New Zealand cricketer. He played two first-class matches for Otago between 1888 and 1890.

See also
 List of Otago representative cricketers

References

External links
 

1869 births
1924 deaths
New Zealand cricketers
Otago cricketers
Cricketers from Dunedin